Loco por vos (translated as Crazy About You and stylized as Loco x Vos)  is an Argentine sitcom, remake of the American series Mad About You. The series stars Juan Minujín, Julieta Zylberberg, Gino Renni, Adriana Aizemberg, Agustina Lecouna, Luis Machín, Fernán Mirás, Marina Bellati, Damián Dreizik, Luz Palarzón and Nancy Gay.

Plot
Pablo (Juan Minujín), a documentary filmmaker, and Natalia (Julieta Zylberberg), a public relations specialist, are a newly married couple who live a story of encounters, whose members must adapt to living, support their respective hobbies, try occupationally consolidate and at the same time, strengthen their bond to be a family.

Cast

Main
Juan Minujín as Pablo Wainstein
Julieta Zylberberg as Natalia "Nati" Armendaris of Wainstein
Fernán Mirás as Martín "Tincho"
Marina Bellati as Julia Bertolo
Agustina Lecouna as Verónica "Vero" Armendaris 
Damián Dreizik as Marcos Bertolo
Pérez as Pérez

Recurring
Gino Renni as Samuel Wainstein
Adriana Aizemberg as Sara Abramowitz of Wainstein
Manuel Vicente as Atilio Armendaris
Luz Palarzón  as Celia Armendaris
Lucía Rivera Bonet as Vicky
Nancy Gay as Úrsula
Fabián Minelli as Hugo
Gonzalo Suárez as Andrés
Pichu Straneo as Alcides

Guest stars
Noelia Marzol as Herself
Nicole Neumann as Herself
Fabián Cubero as Himself
Ivana Nadal as Margarita 
José María Muscari as Benito
Sergio "Maravilla" Martínez as Marcial
Sofía Elliot as Employee of Samuel
Ana Katz as Débora Wainstein
Mariana Chaud as Elena
Chang Sung Kim as Chang
Sebastián Presta as Pedro
Leandro "Chino" Leunis as Humberto Hurón

Series overview

References

External links

Telefe original programming
2010s Argentine comedy television series
Argentine television series based on American television series
2016 Argentine television series debuts
2016 Argentine television series endings
Spanish-language television shows